Lipowski (feminine Lipowska, Polish and Jewish (Ashkenazic): habitational name for someone from any of various places called Lipowo, Lipowa or Lipowe) is a Polish surname. Notable people with the surname include:

 Jan Lipowski (1912–1996), Polish alpine skier
 Teresa Lipowska (born 1937), Polish actress
 Zbigniew J. Lipowski (1924–1997), Polish psychiatrist
 Wieslaw Lipowski (1946-), English-Polish translator

See also 
 Lipovsky (disambiguation)

Polish-language surnames
Polish toponymic surnames
Jewish toponymic surnames